Bothriomyrmex jannonei is a species of ant in the genus Bothriomyrmex. Described by Menozzi in 1936, the species is endemic to Greece.

References

Bothriomyrmex
Hymenoptera of Europe
Fauna of Greece
Insects described in 1936